Maciejów may refer to the following places:
Maciejów, Łęczyca County in Łódź Voivodeship (central Poland)
Maciejów, Zduńska Wola County in Łódź Voivodeship (central Poland)
Maciejów, Lublin Voivodeship (east Poland)
Maciejów, Zgierz County in Łódź Voivodeship (central Poland)
Maciejów, Lesser Poland Voivodeship (south Poland)
Maciejów, Opole Voivodeship (south-west Poland)
Maciejów, West Pomeranian Voivodeship (north-west Poland)
Lukiv, Volyn Oblast, Ukraine (Polish: Maciejów)